The Cincinnati Reds' 1985 season consisted of the Cincinnati Reds attempting to win the National League West. The Reds finished in second place, 5½ games behind the Los Angeles Dodgers. This year, the Reds adopted an alternate uniform. Reds pitcher Tom Browning became the last 20th century pitcher to win 20 games in his rookie year.

Regular season

Pete Rose
On September 11, 1985, Rose was thought to have broken Ty Cobb's all-time hits record with his 4,192nd hit, a single to left-center field off San Diego Padres pitcher Eric Show. A subsequent independent review of Cobb's hits, however, revealed that two of them were double-counted. As a result, it has been suggested that Pete Rose actually broke the all-time hits record against the Cubs' Reggie Patterson with a single in the first in the Reds 5-5 called game against Chicago on September 8.

Season standings

Record vs. opponents

Notable transactions
April 10, 1985: Tony Pérez was signed as a free agent by the Reds.
April 26, 1985: Skeeter Barnes was traded by the Reds to the Montreal Expos for Max Venable.
June 3, 1985: Barry Larkin was drafted by the Reds in the 1st round (4th pick) of the 1985 amateur draft.
June 12, 1985: Brad Gulden was purchased by the Houston Astros from the Cincinnati Reds.
July 19, 1985: Buddy Bell was acquired from the Texas Rangers for Duane Walker and a player to be named later. The Cincinnati Reds later sent Jeff Russell to the Rangers to complete the trade.
August 8, 1985: Alan Knicely, Tom Foley and a player to be named later were traded by the Reds to the Philadelphia Phillies for Bo Díaz and Greg Simpson (minors). The Reds completed the deal by sending Freddie Toliver to the Phillies on August 27.
August 29, 1985: César Cedeño was traded by the Reds to the St. Louis Cardinals for Mark Jackson (minors).

Roster

Player stats

Batting

Starters by position
Note: Pos = Position; G = Games played; AB = At bats; H = Hits; Avg. = Batting average; HR = Home runs; RBI = Runs batted in

Other batters
Note: G = Games played; AB = At bats; H = Hits; Avg. = Batting average; HR = Home runs; RBI = Runs batted in

Pitching

Starting pitchers
Note: G = Games pitched; IP = Innings pitched; W = Wins; L = Losses; ERA = Earned run average; SO = Strikeouts

Other pitchers
Note: G = Games pitched; IP = Innings pitched; W = Wins; L = Losses; ERA = Earned run average; SO = Strikeouts

Relief pitchers
Note: G = Games pitched; W = Wins; L = Losses; SV = Saves; ERA = Earned run average; SO = Strikeouts

Awards and honors
 Dave Parker – National League Leader in RBIs (125)
 Dave Parker – National League Leader in Doubles (42)

Farm system 

LEAGUE CHAMPIONS: Vermont

References

1985 Cincinnati Reds season at Baseball Reference
1985 National League Standings at Baseball Reference

Cincinnati Reds seasons
Cincinnati Reds season
Cinc